Zeus and Roxanne is a 1997 American family adventure film directed by George T. Miller. It revolves around the friendship between the title characters Zeus and Roxanne, a dog and a dolphin, respectively, and the relationships between the human characters played by Steve Guttenberg, Kathleen Quinlan, and Miko Hughes.

Produced by Rysher Entertainment, the film released theatrically in the United States on January 24, 1997, by Metro-Goldwyn-Mayer, grossing $7.2 million. The film received mixed reviews from critics.

Plot
One morning, a dog named Zeus goes to the pier, spots a dolphin, and becomes fascinated by its movements. Afterwards, he returns home to his owner, Terry Barnett, an aspiring musician, and his son, Jordan, who appears to be taking care of him. Later that morning, Zeus chases a cat and subsequently destroys the outdoor garden of Mary Beth Dunhill, a marine biologist and the Barnetts' next-door neighbor. Terry calms Zeus down and apologizes to Mary Beth, although she is agitated by him.

Mary Beth later goes to her workplace and is followed by Zeus, who notices her photo of the same dolphin from earlier. Upon arriving, she is met by her research partner, Becky, and her rival, Claude Carver. Mary Beth and Becky travel out to the ocean on a boat to follow the dolphin they are researching, whom they name Roxanne, and Zeus stows away with them. However, while in the middle of the ocean, he slips off. Roxanne saves him from a shark and gives him a ride back to the boat on her back, which surprises and fascinates Mary Beth and Becky, who find that Zeus and Roxanne can do "inter-species communication". While stopping over on the way home with Zeus, Mary Beth spots her two impossible daughters, Judith and Nora, skating against her wishes. Arriving home, she asks Jordan if she could borrow Zeus for her research on Roxanne, who she hopes to release back into the wild. Jordan agrees, and he and Terry accompany her on her research.

During the following days, Terry begins to fall in love with Mary Beth as he manages to find inspiration for his music, while Jordan bonds with Judith and Nora. After Terry saves Judith and Nora while they are skating in a factory, Mary Beth asks him out on a date. After spending the night at a local beachside resort, they awkwardly kiss. Meanwhile, Claude, wanting research grant money to come to his research and not Mary Beth's, tries to steal hers, but winds up getting comically thwarted by Zeus. Then, he tries gaining the lead in her interspecies communication study, although his attempts to have one of his research dolphins bond with another animal fail one after another.

Through the conniving of Jordan, Judith, and Nora, Terry decides to move into Mary Beth's house with Jordan and Zeus, but after seeing a photo of his late wife, he decides to pursue his original plan of traveling to another town to continue writing his music. This causes both Zeus and Roxanne distress. While staying at a hotel with his owners, Zeus runs away back to Mary Beth's research center. Noticing his disappearance and realizing where he was going, Terry and Jordan return to town, while Mary Beth uses a submersible to go down and investigate the seabed after Claude claims Roxanne was caught in an illegal fishing net and killed. Zeus returns to the research center, where he is captured by Claude, who intends to use him as bait to lure out Roxanne, who is in fact alive, and capture her. However, Zeus and Roxanne work together to trap him and his assistant in a net, where they are arrested by police.

While exploring the seabed, Mary Beth's submersible's propeller is tangled in the fishing nets, and when she opens the main hatch thinking she'd escape through it, water begins flooding the interior. Roxanne leads Terry to Mary Beth, and he manages to free her from the trapped submersible. Afterwards, Jordan, Judith, and Nora convince him to marry her. During the wedding, she is given a grant for her research on Zeus and Roxanne. Immediately afterwards, a pod of dolphins appears, and Zeus convinces Roxanne to join them. Zeus watches happily with Terry, Mary Beth, Jordan, Judith, and Nora as Roxanne leaps into the air with the pod.

Cast

Reception
Critical reception to the film was mixed.
On Rotten Tomatoes, 40% of 10 reviews were positive, with an average rating of 5/10.

Box office
The film debuted at No. 10.

References

External links
 
 

1997 films
Metro-Goldwyn-Mayer films
1990s adventure films
American children's adventure films
American children's comedy films
1990s English-language films
Films about dogs
Films shot in the Bahamas
Films directed by George T. Miller
Films about dolphins
Rysher Entertainment films
1990s American films